Jordanne Whiley defeated the defending champion Yui Kamiji in the final, 6–4, 0–6, 6–1 to win the women's singles wheelchair tennis title at the 2015 US Open.

Seeds

Draw

Draw

External links 
 Draw

Wheelchair Women's Singles
U.S. Open, 2015 Women's Singles